Sharjah Football Club is an Emirati professional football club based in Sharjah that competes in the UAE Pro League. Their home stadium is Sharjah Stadium.

Founded in 1966, it has been the most successful team in the Emirate of Sharjah, winning 6 pro league titles, 9 presidents cups and 2 super cups. The club was also the first official UAE league champion since its establishment in 1974.

Sharjah FC is a professional football club based in Sharjah, Sharjah City, UAE. The club competes in the UAE Adnoc League, the top division in the UAE football league system. Nicknamed the King.

Sharjah have won a 6 League titles, 9 President Cups, 3 Super Cups. In 1990 world cup 8 Player from Sharjah FC were Selected to present the UAE. 

Sharjah FC is one of the most widely supported football clubs in the UAE. Sharjah fans has medium rivalries with Al Ain, Shabab Al Ahli Dubai given the number of trophies the 3 teams have won. In May 2020, Sharjah Club won the title of "the most popular club" in the Arab Gulf League, beating Al-Wahda Club in the referendum launched by (Emirates Today) newspaper,

Sharjah Club also won the title of the most popular club in the Emirates through the vote of the Asian Football Confederation, which aims to identify the most popular game clubs in West Asia. Sharjah Club dissolved first, with 51% votes

History

Golden Age

Sharjah FC was founded in 1966 under the name of Al Oruba Club, they were the first official champions of the UAE League winning it in 1974 after beating Al Ahli and Oman. The club would merge with Al Khaleej in 1974 to form Al Sharjah SCC and relocate their headquarters in Sharjah City. The club would later see itself win the league in 4 more occasions during the 80s and 90s and 8 out of the 22 players in the UAE's 1990 squad were players from Sharjah, more than any other club at the time.

Decline
During the mid-2000s however, Sharjah would see a decline as they would finish in mid-table consecutively and in 2012, the club got relegated for the first time in their history. However, the club managed to quickly get promoted back to the top tier division in 2013.

New Era 

Sharjah has managed to win its first title since 1996 in 2019 with a record of only one loss. The Coach, Mr Abdul Aziz Al Anbary who also was Sharjah player managed to have 6-7 players among the squad From Sharjah football school. Igor Coronado, Adel Al Hosani, Wilton Suarez, Shaheen Abdulrahman, Alhassan Saleh and Ryan Mendes managed to be among the top players of the team in that Season participating nearly in all matches.

On 14 September 2019, Sharjah managed to win their first UAE Super Cup title since 1994 after beating Shabab Al Ahli in penalties 4-3. Sharjah played with 10 players for more than 70 minutes due to the red card of Al Hassan Saleh. The last penalty is scored by Ryan Mendes.

From 2019 to 2022 Sharjah team managed to be top 4 in the UAE league table maintaining consistency and proofing that the golden era is back for Sharjah FC.

In 2022, Sharjah football team was crowned champion of His Highness the President's Football Cup for the ninth time in its history, after defeating Al Wahda 1-0 on Friday night.
Sharjah won the Cup in the final match that was held at Hazza Bin Zayed Stadium in Al Ain in the midst of a large audience of 20,000 spectators. The Spanish Paco Alcácer scored the only goal of the match from a free kick in the 53rd minute, before he was substituted. The "king" returned to the podium after an absence of 19 years, specifically since they won the eighth title in 2003, and interestingly enough, won that edition over Al-Wahda as well, but on penalties

In 25 Feb, 2023 Sharjah beat Al Ain 1-0 in a pulsating UAE Super Cup clash at the Al Maktoum Stadium in front of a capacity 15,000 crowd to win the first title of 2023. Sharjah went ahead in the 29th minute with an own goal from Laba Kodjo, who inadvertently turned Caio Lucas' header into his net.

Honours
19 Official Championships

Domestic

Leagues
UAE League
Champions (6): 1973–74, 1986–87, 1988–89, 1993–94, 1995–96, 2018–19

UAE Division One
Champions: 1992–93

Cups
UAE President's Cup
Winners (9): 1978–79, 1979–80, 1981–82, 1982–83, 1990–91, 1994–95, 1997–98, 2002–03, 2021–22

UAE Super Cup
Winners (3): 1994, 2019, 2022

Joint League Cup
Winners: 1977

GCC Champions League
 Runners-up: 1991

Club officials

Current squad

Out on loan

Performance in AFC competitions
 AFC Champions League: 6 appearances
2004: Quarter Finals
2009: Withdrew
2011: Withdrew
2020: Group Stage
2021: Round of 16
2022: Group Stage

AFC Champions League history

 Asian Club Championship: 2 appearances
1989: Group Stage
1994: First Round

Asian Club Championship history

Record By Country

Club managers

  Joe Kinnear (1978)
  Djalma Alves (1981–83)
  Procópio Cardoso (1984)
  Yury Mozorov (1992–93)
  Faouzi Benzarti (2000–Dec 01)
  Waheed Al Tuweiri (Dec 2001)
  Dragan Jolgina (Dec 2001–June 2)
  Paul Dolezar (June 2002–??)
  Ghazi Ghrairi
  Srećko Juričić (July 1, 2006 – Nov 1, 2006)
  Rainer Zobel (2006)
  Gerard van der Lem (July 1, 2007 – May 1, 2008)
  Manuel Cajuda (July 13, 2009 – May 21, 2011)
  Abdulmajid (May 22, 2011 – June 16, 2011)
  Carlos Azenha (June 17, 2011 – Nov 14, 2011)
  Valeriu Tiţa (Sept 18, 2011 – Dec 14, 2011)
  Jorvan Vieira (Dec 16, 2011 – Feb 2, 2012)
  Valeriu Tiţa (2012)
  Faouzi Benzarti (2013)
  Paulo Bonamigo (May 25, 2013 – 2015)
  Abdulaziz Mohamed (2015 – 2016)
  Giorgos Donis (July 2016 – Dec 2016 )
  José Peseiro (Jan 2017 – Oct 2017)
  Abdulaziz Al Yassi (Oct 2017 – Oct 2021) 
  Cosmin Olăroiu (Nov 2021 – present)

Pro-League record

Notes 2019–20 UAE football season was cancelled due to the COVID-19 pandemic in the United Arab Emirates.

Key
 Pos. = Position
 Tms. = Number of teams
 Lvl. = League

References

External links
 Sharjah FC official website

Football clubs in the United Arab Emirates
Sport in Sharjah (city)
Association football clubs established in 1966
1966 establishments in the Trucial States
Sport in the Emirate of Sharjah